(), is an auxiliary sociolect for translating literature into Esperanto created to act as a fictional 'Old Esperanto', in the vein of languages such as Middle English or the use of Latin citations in modern texts.

It was created by Manuel Halvelik as part of a range of stylistic variants including Gavaro (slang) and Popido (patois), forming .

Halvelik also compiled a scientific vocabulary closer to Greco-Latin roots and proposed its application to fields such as taxonomy and linguistics. He gave this register of Esperanto the name  ('Universal Esperanto').

The idea of an "old Esperanto" was proposed by the Hungarian poet Kalman Kalocsay who in 1931 included a translation of the Funeral Sermon and Prayer, the first Hungarian text (12th century), with hypothetic forms as if Esperanto were a Romance language deriving from Vulgar Latin.

(the sociolect triple) does not create new Esperantidos (e.g. Esperanto II), but its sole purpose—including Arcaicam Esperantom—is to reflect styles in literature translated into Esperanto, like the Berlin Middle-German dialect spoken by characters in Carl Zuckmayer's Captain of Köpenick (Popido), or ancient styles in Walter Scott's Ivanhoe (Arcaicam Esperantom).

Differences from Esperanto

Spelling

The three following rules are also added:

  becomes  (but see below regarding  adverbs)

diphthongs
    becomes  (but see below regarding  adverbs)
    becomes

consonant clusters
    becomes 
    becomes 
    becomes

Pronouns

Pronouns are changed as:

*herself/himself/itself/themselves

 There is an old pronoun  which is a personal, sex-neutral pronoun (utrum). Its intended use is for referring to deities, angels, animals etc.

Verbs
Ex.:  becomes .
 The verb endings change according to the subject. So it is not necessary to write the subject pronoun, where there is no ambiguity.

Ex: The modern Esperanto verb  (to be), present tense:
 

The Arcaicam Esperantom verb  (to be), present tense:
 
 
 
 
 
 

The other verb tenses behave the same way, as does the conditional mood:
 The future-tense conjugation  becomes , etc.
 The past-tense conjugation  becomes , etc.
 The conditional-mood conjugation  becomes , etc.

The imperative mood behaves differently from that pattern:
 The imperative form  stays  for singular subjects, but becomes  for plural subjects.

Nominals

  becomes  (sg. noun, nominative)
  becomes  (pl. noun, nominative)
  stays  (sg. noun, accusative). Where Esperanto has a direction accusative, the dative is used. E.g.:  becomes   . 
  becomes  (pl. noun, accusative)
  x becomes x (sg. noun, dative – ex.:  becomes )
  x becomes x (pl. noun, dative – ex.:  becomes )
  x becomes x (sg. noun, genitive – ex.:  becomes )
  x becomes x (pl. noun, genitive – ex.:  becomes )
  becomes  (adverb) (This is a new phoneme, not present in modern Esperanto.  It is pronounced like the German .)
  becomes  (sg. adjective, nominative)
  becomes  (pl. adjective, nominative)
 A noun is always written with a capital letter. Ex:  = .
 The verb infinitive can function as a noun, having the meaning that is carried in modern Esperanto by the root with the suffix .  The infinitive functioning as a noun takes, as does any other noun, both a capital letter and a case ending.  Ex:  = .
The declension of personal pronouns below, however, differs significantly from declensions of nouns or adjectives. These personal pronouns have their own adjectival forms.

Correlatives
  becomes 
  becomes 
  becomes 
  becomes 
  becomes 
  becomes 

(Note: , which in modern Esperanto is not a correlative despite its use in that fashion by some, becomes in Arcaicam Esperantom as  a full-fledged correlative.)

  becomes 
  becomes 
  becomes 
  becomes 
  becomes 
 ( stays )
 ( stays )
 the particle  becomes is- ( = )

Articles
 The definite article  does not exist in Arcaicam Esperantom.
 The indefinite article, which modern Esperanto does not have, does exist in Arcaicam Esperantom.

Examples

The Lord's Prayer

Romeo and Juliet

Phrases
  –'''Hello everyone, how are you?'
 . – 'He comes from Białystok.'
 ? – 'What is your name?'
 . – 'My name is Peter.'
 . – 'I understand that well.'
 . – 'One hand washes the other (hand).'
 . – '' (Vergil)
 . – '' (Thomas à Kempis)
 . – '' (Julius Caesar)
 . – '' (Plautus)

See also

 Proto-Esperanto
 Esperantido

References
 Arkaika Esperanto : Arcaicam Esperantom. Brugge: Sonorilo, 1969. 122 pages.
 Arkaika Esperanto : Arcaicam Esperantom''. 2010 edition. 258 pages. Downloadable as a 9MB PDF file.

External links
 Arcaicam Esperantom at the Conlang Atlas of Language Structures.

Esperantido
Esperanto
1969 books
Constructed languages
Archaic words and phrases